The women's discus throw event at the 1981 Summer Universiade was held at the Stadionul Naţional in Bucharest on 24 July 1981.

Results

References

Athletics at the 1981 Summer Universiade
1981